Rune Tangen (born 16 December 1964 in Norway) is a Norwegian retired international footballer.

References

External links
 
 

Norwegian footballers
Living people
1964 births
Association football defenders
Association football midfielders
People from Moss, Norway
Moss FK players
Rosenborg BK players
FC Tirol Innsbruck players
LASK players
Norway under-21 international footballers
Norway international footballers
Norwegian expatriate footballers
Expatriate footballers in Austria
Norwegian expatriate sportspeople in Austria
Sportspeople from Viken (county)